Buckeye Creek is a tributary of Middle Island Creek,  long, in north-central West Virginia in the United States.

Buckeye Creek's course is entirely in Doddridge County. Downstream of Sherwood, the stream is largely paralleled by U.S. Route 50 and the North Bend Rail Trail. It joins the Meathouse Fork to form Middle Island Creek at the community of Smithburg.

According to the Geographic Names Information System, Buckeye Creek has also been known historically by the name "Buckey Fork."

See also
List of rivers of West Virginia

References 

Rivers of West Virginia
Rivers of Doddridge County, West Virginia